Stelis immersa is a species of orchid found from Mexico to northern Venezuela. It is pollinated by the females of a fly species in the genus Megaselia.

References

External links 

immersa
Orchids of Mexico
Orchids of Venezuela